Nidia Munoz (born May 8, 1991 in Santiago de Cuba) is a Cuban taekwondo practitioner. At the 2012 Summer Olympics, she competed in the Women's 57 kg event, but was defeated in the first round by the Lebanese athlete Andrea Paoli.

References

External links
sports-reference.com

Cuban female taekwondo practitioners
1991 births
Living people
Olympic taekwondo practitioners of Cuba
Sportspeople from Santiago de Cuba
Taekwondo practitioners at the 2012 Summer Olympics
21st-century Cuban women